Jesse F. McClure III (born 1972) is a Judge of the Texas Court of Criminal Appeals.

Biography 

McClure graduated from Marcos de Niza High School in Tempe, Arizona, received his Bachelor of Arts, with honors, from the University of North Carolina at Chapel Hill, and his Juris Doctor from the University of Texas School of Law. He spent the 1992–1993 academic year at the University of Sussex near Brighton, United Kingdom.

Legal career 

McClure began his career as an associate with Brown McCarroll and Oaks Hartline, and then served as an Assistant District Attorney for Tarrant County. He was briefly an attorney at the United States Department of Homeland Security, and then became a special prosecutor for the Texas Department of Insurance.

State court service 

In 2019, Governor Greg Abbott appointed McClure to the trial court bench in Harris County. He was elevated to the Texas Court of Criminal Appeals in December 2020. He is the first African American judge on the court since 1998, and the third African American judge on the court in Texas history. Judge McClure was elected to a full term in 2022, recording the largest margin of victory by percentage of any statewide candidate on the ballot.

McClure is also the sixth African American to hold statewide office in Texas overall following Louis Sturns, Morris Overstreet, Michael Williams, Wallace Jefferson and Dale Wainwright.

See also 
 List of African-American jurists

References

External links 
 

|-

1972 births
Living people
20th-century American lawyers
21st-century American lawyers
21st-century American judges
African-American lawyers
African-American judges
American prosecutors
Judges of the Texas Court of Criminal Appeals
Lawyers from Sacramento, California
Texas lawyers
Texas Republicans
Texas state court judges
United States Department of Homeland Security officials
20th-century African-American people
21st-century African-American people